A Kibble balance is an electromechanical measuring instrument that measures the weight of a test object very precisely by the electric current and voltage needed to produce a compensating force.  It is a metrological instrument that can realize the definition of the kilogram unit of mass based on fundamental constants.

It was originally called the watt balance because the weight of the test mass is proportional to the product of current and voltage, which is measured in watts.  In June 2016, two months after the death of its inventor, Bryan Kibble, metrologists of the Consultative Committee for Units of the International Committee for Weights and Measures agreed to rename the device in his honor.

Prior to 2019, the definition of the kilogram was based on a physical object known as the International Prototype of the Kilogram (IPK).
After considering alternatives, in 2013 the General Conference on Weights and Measures (CGPM) agreed on accuracy criteria for replacing this definition with one based on the use of a Kibble balance. After these criteria had been achieved, the CGPM voted unanimously on November 16, 2018 to change the definition of the kilogram and several other units, effective May 20, 2019, to coincide with World Metrology Day.

Design 

The Kibble balance is a more accurate version of the ampere balance, an early current measuring instrument in which the force between two current-carrying coils of wire is measured and then used to calculate the magnitude of the current. The Kibble balance operates in the opposite sense; the current in the coils is measured using the definition of the Planck constant to "measure mass without recourse to the IPK or any physical object". The balance determines the weight of the object; then the mass is calculated by accurately measuring the local Earth's gravity (the net acceleration combining gravitational and centrifugal effects) with a gravimeter. Thus the mass of the object is defined in terms of a current and a voltage—an "electronic kilogram".

Origin 
The principle that is used in the Kibble balance was proposed by Bryan Kibble of the UK National Physical Laboratory (NPL) in 1975 for measurement of the gyromagnetic ratio. In 1978 the Mark I watt balance was built at the NPL with Ian Robinson and Ray Smith.  It operated until 1988.

The main weakness of the ampere balance method is that the result depends on the accuracy with which the dimensions of the coils are measured. The Kibble balance uses an extra calibration step to cancel the effect of the geometry of the coils, removing the main source of uncertainty. This extra step involves moving the force coil through a known magnetic flux at a known speed. This was possible by setting of the conventional values of the von Klitzing constant and Josephson constant, which are used throughout the world for voltage and resistance calibration. Using these principles Bryan Kibble and Ian Robinson invented the Kibble Mark II balance, which uses a circular coil and operates in vacuum conditions in 1990. Bryan Kibble worked with Ian Robinson and Janet Belliss to build this Mark Two version of the balance. This design allowed for measurements accurate enough for use in the redefinition of the SI unit of mass: the kilogram.

The Kibble balance originating from the National Physical Laboratory was transferred to the National Research Council of Canada (NRC) in 2009, where scientists from the two labs continued to refine the instrument.
In 2014, NRC researchers published the most accurate measurement of the Planck constant at that time, with a relative uncertainty of 1.8. A final paper by NRC researchers was published in May 2017, presenting a measurement of Planck's constant with an uncertainty of only 9.1 parts per billion, the measurement with the least uncertainty to that date. Other Kibble balance experiments are conducted in the US National Institute of Standards and Technology (NIST), the Swiss Federal Office of Metrology (METAS) in Berne, the International Bureau of Weights and Measures (BIPM) near Paris and Laboratoire national de métrologie et d’essais (LNE) in Trappes, France.

Principle 
A conducting wire of length  that carries an electric current  perpendicular to a magnetic field of strength  experiences a Lorentz force equal to the product of these variables. In the Kibble balance, the current is varied so that this force counteracts the weight  of a mass  to be measured. This principle is derived from the ampere balance.   is given by the mass  multiplied by the local gravitational acceleration . Thus,
  
The same wire (in practice, a coil) is moved through the same magnetic field at a known speed . By Faraday's law of induction, a potential difference  is generated across the ends of the wire, which equals . Thus 
 
The unknown product  can be eliminated from the equations to give

Both sides of the equation have the dimensions of power, measured in watts in the International System of Units; hence the original name "watt balance". The product , also called the geometric factor, is not trivially equal in both calibration steps. The geometric factor is only constant under certain stability conditions on the coil.

Implementation

The Kibble balance is constructed so that the mass to be measured and the wire coil are suspended from one side of a balance scale, with a counterbalance mass on the other side. The system operates by alternating between two modes: "weighing" and "moving". The entire mechanical subsystem operates in a vacuum chamber to remove the effects of air buoyancy.

The system controls the current in the coil to pull the coil through a magnetic field at a constant velocity . Coil position and velocity measurement circuitry uses an interferometer together with a precision clock input to determine the velocity and control the current needed to maintain it. The required current is measured, using an ammeter comprising a Josephson junction voltage standard and an integrating voltmeter.

While "moving", the system measures . The system ceases to provide current to the coil. This allows the counterbalance to pull the coil (and mass) upward through the magnetic field, which causes a voltage difference across the coil. The velocity measurement circuitry measures the speed of movement of the coil. This voltage is measured, using the same voltage standard and integrating voltmeter.

Instead,  is measured in the same laboratory using a highly accurate and precise gravimeter. In addition, the balance depends on a highly accurate and precise frequency reference such as an atomic clock to compute voltage and current. Thus, the precision and accuracy of the mass measurement depends on the Kibble balance, the gravimeter, and the clock.

Like the early atomic clocks, the early Kibble balances were one-of-a-kind experimental devices and were large, expensive, and delicate. As of 2019, work is underway to produce standardized devices at prices that permit use in any metrology laboratory that requires high-precision measurement of mass.

As well as large Kibble balances, microfabricated or MEMS watt balances (now called Kibble balances) have been demonstrated since around 2003. These are fabricated on single silicon dies similar to those used in microelectronics and accelerometers, and are capable of measuring small forces in the nanonewton to micronewton range traceably to the SI-defined physical constants via electrical and optical measurements. Due to their small scale, MEMS Kibble balances typically use electrostatic rather than the inductive forces used in larger instruments. Lateral and torsional variants have also been demonstrated, with the main application (as of 2019) being in the calibration of the atomic force microscope. Accurate measurements by several teams will enable their results to be averaged and so reduce the experimental error.

Measurements 

Accurate measurements of electric current and potential difference are made in conventional electrical units (rather than SI units), which are based on fixed "conventional values" of the Josephson constant and the von Klitzing constant,  and  respectively. The current Kibble balance experiments are equivalent to measuring the value of the conventional watt in SI units. From the definition of the conventional watt, this is equivalent to measuring the value of the product  in SI units instead of its fixed value in conventional electrical units:

The importance of such measurements is that they are also a direct measurement of the Planck constant :

The principle of the electronic kilogram relies on the value of the Planck constant, which is as of 2019 an exact value. This is similar to the metre being defined by the speed of light. With the constant defined exactly, the Kibble balance is not an instrument to measure the Planck constant, but is instead an instrument to measure mass:

See also 
 Gouy balance

References

External links 
 
 
 Bureau International des Poids et Mesures
 Swiss Federal Office of Metrology

Measuring instruments